The Citroën LN (Hélène) and Citroën LNA (Hélèna) are front-engine, front-drive, three-door, four passenger hatchback city cars manufactured and marketed by Citroën from 1976-1986 over a single generation — as a badge engineered variant of the Peugeot 104, introduced shortly after the takeover of Citroen by Peugeot. 

The added "A" used in the name of the bigger engined LNA stood for Athlétique (Athletic).

Citroën LN (1976–1978)
The LN was introduced in July 1976. It combined the bodyshell of the Peugeot 104 Z (a shortened floorpan version of the 104) with the economical 602 cc two-cylinder gasoline engine of the Citroën 2CV. Equipment levels were low, but the LN's key selling points were its low price and running costs.

Strongly resembling the Peugeot it was based on, the LN was assembled at a Citroën plant and fitted with a Citroën engine.  Peugeot had recently acquired Citroen and the LN stood in stark contrast to assurances that the two marques would retain their individuality. When pressed, Citroën explained that the LN project had been rushed through because of "the need to supply customers and the [dealership] network with a model to strengthen Citroën's position at the lower end of the market," hardly a ringing endorsement.  The Citroen range included the Ami and the Dyane as well as the venerable 2CV which would continue in production well after the others. Citroën made it clear that this would not happen again, which remained largely true until the Citroën Saxo, which was a badge engineered variant of the Peugeot 106 (itself developed from the Citroen AX platform).

Citroën LNA (1978–1986)
Citroën marketed the LN mainly in Southern Europe and neighbouring countries, and a more powerful replacement, the LNA, was introduced on 6 November 1978 and was exported to much of the rest of Europe (including right-hand drive versions for Great Britain, where it was not launched until early 1983). It had the more powerful and modern 652 cc two-cylinder engine of the Citroën Visa with electronic ignition. In December 1982 a 1.1 L four-cylinder engine was added which had a top speed of nearly 90 mph (145 km/h) for the LNA 11E and 11RE, which spelled the end of the two-cylinder models in many markets. But like the smaller-engined LN, the LNA was cheap to buy and cheap to run. For Italy and France only, there was also an intermediate version called the LNA 10E, with a 954 cc Peugeot engine.

By 1980 a variant of the LNA could was marketed in France as the "LNA Entreprise", with the back seat removed. This was effectively a function of taxation rules, whereby the two-seater car could be sold with a reduced rate of value-added tax.

After the LNA's launch, it spawned another badge engineered variant, the Talbot Samba, featuring square headlights and a different, slightly longer, rear body section. The mechanicals and a developed version of the full length 104 floorpan were used in the Citroën Visa that was also launched in 1978. 1983 cars arrived early, in July 1982, and benefited from new molded black plastic bumpers, a new decoration for the C-pillar, a newly positioned rubber side-strip, new larger rear lights on a black-painted rear panel, blacked out chrome window trim, and more elaborately styled wheels which were shared with the manufacturer's Visa Super E. The interior was also improved (with a parcel shelf, for instance) and the folding rear seat was now split. In July 1985 Citroën introduced cars for the 1986 model year. The previously black grill and bumpers were now coloured grey, although LNA production ceased in the summer of 1986, around the same time as the Talbot Samba. Its successor, the Citroën AX, was launched shortly afterwards.

It was not launched onto the British market until early 1983, where the most popular entry-level small cars were the Austin Metro and Ford Fiesta. It also reached the UK market during the same year as the Fiat Uno, Nissan Micra, Peugeot 205 and Vauxhall Nova, but failed to prove anywhere near as popular as any of these cars and was withdrawn from sale there after just two years.

The Peugeot 104 remained in production until 1988 even though its popular successor, the 205, had been launched five years earlier, as an entry level model in some markets. The Visa also lasted until 1988. The Visa-based box van Citroën C15 version was the longest lasting 104 derivative, using 205 and 206 mechanicals it was made until 2005.

Technical specifications

References

1980s cars
Cars introduced in 1976
Cars powered by boxer engines
LNA
City cars
Front-wheel-drive vehicles
Hatchbacks